Jean-Pierre Gasparotti (born 26 June 1942) is a Monegasque sports shooter. He competed in the men's 50 metre free pistol event at the 1984 Summer Olympics.

References

1942 births
Living people
Monegasque male sport shooters
Olympic shooters of Monaco
Shooters at the 1984 Summer Olympics
Place of birth missing (living people)